St Vincent's Hospital, St. Vincent Hospital or St. Vincent's Medical Center may refer to:

Australia 
St Vincent's Hospital (Brisbane), Queensland, Australia
St Vincent's Hospital, Melbourne, in Fitzroy, Melbourne, Australia
St Vincent's Hospital, Sydney, in Darlinghurst, New South Wales, a  suburb of Sydney
St Vincent's Private Hospital Melbourne, Victoria

Ireland 
St. Vincent's Hospital, Athy, County Kildare
St. Vincent's Hospital, Fairview, Dublin
St. Vincent's Private Hospital (Dublin)
St. Vincent's University Hospital, Dublin

United Kingdom 
St Vincent's Hospital, Kingussie, Scotland

United States 
(by state, then city)

St. Vincent's Health System, a hospital and specialty clinic operator based in Birmingham, Alabama
St. Vincent Medical Center (Los Angeles), California
St. Vincent's Medical Center (Bridgeport), Connecticut
St. Vincent's HealthCare, a hospital network in Jacksonville, Florida
St. Vincent's Medical Center Riverside, Jacksonville, Florida
St. Vincent's Medical Center Southside, Jacksonville, Florida
 St. Vincent Health, health system based in Indiana
 St. Vincent Indianapolis Hospital, Indianapolis, Indiana
 St. Vincent Williamsport Hospital, Williamsport, Indiana
 St. Vincent Evansville, Evansville, Indiana
Saint Vincent Hospital, Erie, Pennsylvania
Saint Vincent Hospital, Worcester, Massachusetts
St. Vincent's Hospital (Normandy, Missouri)
CHRISTUS St. Vincent Regional Medical Center, formerly St. Vincent Hospital, Santa Fe, New Mexico
Saint Vincent's Catholic Medical Center, New York City (defunct)
St. Vincent's Hospital (Staten Island), New York, former name of Richmond University Medical Center
St. Vincent Charity Medical Center, Cleveland, Ohio
St. Vincent Mercy Children's Hospital, Toledo, Ohio
Mercy Health - St. Vincent Medical Center, Toledo, Ohio
Providence St. Vincent Medical Center, Portland, Oregon
St. Vincent Hospital, Green Bay, Wisconsin

See also 
 Saint Vincent (disambiguation)
 St. Vincent's (disambiguation)